Eddie Berry was a professional baseball shortstop in the Negro leagues. He played with the Memphis Red Sox in 1930.

References

External links
 and Seamheads 

Memphis Red Sox players
Year of birth missing
Year of death missing
Baseball shortstops